Peggo Devon Canada Aerodrome  was a registered aerodrome located  southeast of Peggo, British Columbia, Canada.

References

Defunct airports in British Columbia
Northern Rockies Regional Municipality